David McGuire (13 November 1931 – 26 February 2007) was an Australian cricketer. He played three first-class matches for Tasmania between 1956 and 1959.

See also
 List of Tasmanian representative cricketers

References

External links
 

1931 births
2007 deaths
Australian cricketers
Tasmania cricketers
Cricketers from Hobart